Mary Claire Engstrom (October 1, 1906 – May 20, 1997) was an American writer and historian. She is best known for her active role in preserving the historic town of Hillsborough, North Carolina.

Biography
Mary was born in Kansas City, and was the daughter of Lester L. Randolph and Florence Alberta Toynbee Randolph. She  earned a Ph.D. at University of North Carolina in English literature in 1939, and did postdoctoral research at Harvard and Yale, specializing in 18-century satire.

With her Alfred G. Engstrom (1907-1990), a professor of French at the university, in 1959, she purchased the historic Nash-Hooper House in Hillsborough.

She began to do historical documentation of Hillsborough and its surroundings.

References

American women writers
American women historians
1906 births
1997 deaths
Writers from Kansas City, Missouri
University of North Carolina alumni